The Burkina Faso national baseball team also known as The Upright Men, is a baseball team which represents Burkina Faso in international baseball competitions.

Baseball was introduced in Burkina Faso in the late 1990s. In 2016, a group of ten players from the national team went to Japan to train.

Seventeen national baseball teams in Africa were divided into four zones for the 2020 Olympics qualifiers, and Burkina Faso competed in Zone West 1 against Team Ghana, Team Nigeria, Team Tunisia, and Team Cote d’Ivoire. In April 2019 at the first African West One pre-qualifier for the 2020 Olympics, the team defeated Team Nigeria (13–3) and Team Ghana (14–4). It lost in the semi-final in May to Team South Africa, 16–1.

References 

National baseball teams in Africa
National sports teams of Burkina Faso